The Great Western Railway (GWR) 5400 Class was a class of 0-6-0 pannier tank steam locomotive. They were similar in appearance to many other GWR tank engines but smaller than the ubiquitous GWR 5700 Class.

The nominally Collett-designed 5400 Class had  driving wheels for greater top speed with autocoaches, and were all fitted with the required remote control gear for working the push-pull autotrains. They had a modern cab and a larger bunker. They were frequently seen on inner suburban routes from Paddington.

History
The 5400 class was related to the 2021 class saddle tank, designed by William Dean and built at Wolverhampton railway works. This was a light compact design with  wheels, itself derived from the smaller Armstrong GWR 850 Class dating from 1874.

The class pioneer was not a new engine at all, rather it was a 1930 rebuild of 2021 tank 2080. It merely had substitute larger wheels and splashers and a larger bunker, whereas the new locos built from 1931 onwards had the rounded-edge cab as well. This cab style was to be fitted to all subsequent GWR pannier tank designs including the later derivations of the 5700 Class.

Despite its success, the prototype had a short life as number 5400, lasting only two years before scrapping. It was replaced with an all-new engine with the same number. 25 locomotives were built and they were numbered 5400–5424.

Withdrawal and mileages 
Withdrawal from service with BR started in 1957 and was completed in 1963. The last ones in service were No. 5410, No. 5416, and No. 5420.

le Fleming noted that the mileages of those withdrawn between February 1957 and February 1958 were "from 671,000 to 775,000".

GWR 6400 and 7400 classes

This produced two general purpose classes with wide route availability. The 6400 was auto-fitted but more suitable for hilly routes than the 5400. The 7400 was not auto-fitted.

See also
 GWR 0-6-0PT – list of classes of GWR 0-6-0 pannier tank, including table of preserved locomotives

References

Sources

External links

 5400 Class
 
 

 General 
 Guide to GWR Pannier Tank Classes

0-6-0PT locomotives
5400
Railway locomotives introduced in 1930
Standard gauge steam locomotives of Great Britain
Scrapped locomotives
Passenger locomotives